Oludotun Baiyewu Jacobs,  (born 11 July 1942), known professionally as Olu Jacobs, is a Nigerian actor and film executive.  He has starred in several British television series and international films. Olu Jacobs has been hailed by many as one of the greatest and most widely respected African actors of his generation. Together with Pete Edochie, he is considered by several media, film commentators, critics, and other actors to be one of the most influential African actors of all time, and is widely regarded as a cultural icon. He is seen as the bridge between the old Actors and the new ones.

Jacobs has made his mark in Nigeria's movie industry, Nollywood. With more than 40 years of acting experience, he is seen as a bridge between the old and new breed of actors. Trained at The Royal Academy of Dramatic Arts, England, he worked with various repertoire theatres in Britain and starred in some international movies.

In 2007, he won the African Movie Academy Award for Best Actor in a Leading Role. Olu Jacobs has distinguished himself as a godfather in Nollywood, paving a successful path for many emerging actors and actresses in the industry. His love for acting was inspired by the late legendary film maker, Hubert Ogunde's annual concert party which held at Colonial Hotel in Kano, thereafter he travelled to England where he studied acting at the Royal Academy of Dramatic Arts in London. He has been described as 'one of Nollywood's finest actors, best role interpreter and the best manipulator of words'. For his dedication to his acting career spanning over five decades, he was honoured with the Industry Merit Award for outstanding achievements in acting at the 2013 Africa Magic Viewers Choice Awards.' MAA also conferred its Lifetime Achievement Award on him in 2016.

Olu Jacobs is married to veteran actress Joke Silva. The couple founded and operate the Lufodo Group, a media corporation that consists of film production, distribution assets and the Lufodo Academy of Performing Arts.

Biography
Oludotun Baiyewu Jacobs was born to parents from Egba Alake. He spent his early childhood in Kano and attended Holy Trinity School where he was a member of the debating and drama societies. He was inspired to take a chance with acting when he attended one of Chief Hubert Ogunde's annual concert party at Colonial Hotel in Kano. Afterwards, he secured a visa and travelled to England to study acting.

In England, Jacobs trained at The Royal Academy of Dramatic Arts in London. He then appeared in various British television shows and series in the 1970s (including The Goodies, Till Death Us Do Part, Barlow at Large, The Venturers, Angels, 1990, The Tomorrow People and The Professionals). In 1978, he played the role of President Mageeba in Michael Codron's presentation of Sir Tom Stoppard's play Night and Day.

In the 1980s Jacobs appeared in several international films, including John Irvin's war film The Dogs of War, Roman Polanski's adventure-comedy Pirates (1986) and the family-adventure film Baby: Secret of the Lost Legend (1985). On television, he was a cast member in TVS's The Witches and the Grinnygog.

Jacobs has subsequently starred in over 120 Nollywood films. He is considered one of the top Nigerian Nollywood actors.

Personal life 
Jacobs is married to Nollywood actress Joke Silva since 1989. They have children. Asked why his wife still bears her maiden name, Jacobs answered: "She is her own individual. When I met her, she was an actress known as Joke Silva so why should marrying me now deny her and her audience her name. She is Miss Joke Silva who is Mrs. Joke Jacobs. It is as simple as that. People began to say what they like. They have even written that we are separated and all sorts of stuff. When she was working, she is Joke Silva and as well as Mrs Joke Jacobs at home." Rumour had it that Olu Jacob died in 2021, but he attended Afriff in November 2021, where he won the Lifetime Achievement Award. His wife Joke Silva later revealed his health condition in an interview with Chude Jideonwo that he is battling Dementia with Lewy bodies .

Accolades
Olu Jacobs was honoured with the prestigious Industry Merit Award for outstanding achievements in acting at the 2013 Africa Magic Viewers Choice Awards.

In August 2022,he was presented an icon award and a membership certificate along with is wife by Audio-Visual Rights Society of Nigeria (AVRS)

Stage (selected)

Filmography

Film

Television

References

External links 
 
 

Living people
Male actors from Abeokuta
Yoruba male actors
Nigerian male film actors
Best Actor Africa Movie Academy Award winners
1942 births
Alumni of RADA
20th-century Nigerian male actors
21st-century Nigerian male actors
Nigerian male television actors
Members of the Order of the Federal Republic
Male actors in Yoruba cinema
Nigerian expatriates in England